Ischnocampa discopuncta is a moth of the family Erebidae. It was described by George Hampson in 1901. It is found in Bolivia and Peru.

References

 

Ischnocampa
Moths described in 1901